Linger is a 2008 Hong Kong romantic drama film directed by Johnnie To and starring Li Bingbing and Vic Chou.

Plot
Dong (Vic Chou) was dating Fan, but was infatuated with Yan (Li Bing Bing). Dong suddenly dies in a fatal car accident, and Yan is badly affected. She relies on medication to escape from the reality and her true feelings toward Dong. Three years pass, and Yan takes advice from Dr. Yuen (Roy Cheung) to finally relinquish the medication. She starts seeing Dong repeatedly in her dreams and begins to suspect that her encounter with Dong is real. At the same time, she realizes that she is slowly falling in love with Dong. At last, Yan frees her true self to Dong and he fades away gradually as they both defeat the affliction within their hearts.

Cast
 Li Bingbing as Foo Yan-Kai
 Vic Chou as Zeng Jing-Dong
 Maggie Shiu as Miss Chan
 Lam Suet as Yan's Father
 Roy Cheung as Dr. Yuen
 Wong You-Nam as Hui Luk-Wo
 You Yong as Dong's Father

Production
Linger pairs Taiwanese F4 pop star Vic Chou, with Mainland Chinese actress Li Bingbing. The film was shot mostly in Mandarin, to suit the language abilities of the two leads.

Reception

Box office
Linger was released in Hong Kong on 10 January 2008. On opening weekend, it grossed HK$82,209. At the end of its box office run, it made a total gross of $156,915.

Critical reception
Linger was met with mostly negative reviews from critics who felt that the film was  targeted for younger female audiences and fans of the two leads. Some blamed Ivy Ho's screenplay for being poorly developed.

See also
 Johnnie To filmography

References

External links
 
 

Hong Kong romantic drama films
2008 films
Milkyway Image films
Films directed by Johnnie To